Cuq or CUQ may refer to:

Places
 Cuq, Lot-et-Garonne, commune in the Lot-et-Garonne department, France
 Cuq, Tarn, commune in the Tarn department, France
 Cuq-Toulza, commune in the Tarn department, France

People with the surname
Henri Cuq (1942–2010), French politician
Pierre Mondy (1925-2012), French actor, born Pierre Cuq

Sports
CUQ or Círculo Universitario de Quilmes, Argentine rugby union club based in Quilmes, Buenos Aires

Languages
Cun language (an ISO 639-3 language code: cuq)

Occitan-language surnames